Miguel Enrique Andújar (born March 2, 1995) is a Dominican professional baseball third baseman and left fielder in the Pittsburgh Pirates organization. He made his MLB debut with the New York Yankees in 2017 and played for them until 2022.

Early life
Andújar was born in San Cristóbal, Dominican Republic.

Career

Minor leagues
Andújar signed with the New York Yankees as an international free agent in July 2011. He made his professional debut in 2012 with the Gulf Coast Yankees. He played the 2013 season for the Gulf Coast Yankees 2 and the 2014 season for the Charleston RiverDogs of the Class A South Atlantic League. In 2015, Andújar played for the Tampa Yankees of the Class A-Advanced Florida State League. He started 2016 with Tampa before being promoted to the Trenton Thunder of the Class AA Eastern League. After the 2016 season he played in the Arizona Fall League. The Yankees added him to their 40-man roster after the season. Andújar began the 2017 season with Trenton, and he batted .312 with seven home runs and 52 runs batted in (RBIs), which were leading the Eastern League, through 67 games. Following a season-ending injury to Gleyber Torres in June, he was promoted to the Scranton/Wilkes-Barre RailRiders of the Class AAA International League.

New York Yankees

After playing in seven games with the RailRiders, the Yankees promoted Andújar to the major leagues on June 28, when Matt Holliday, the Yankees designated hitter, went on the disabled list. He made his major league debut as the Yankees' designated hitter that day against the Chicago White Sox, going 3-for-4 with four RBIs and a walk, breaking the Yankees' record for most RBIs in a player's first game. The next day, the Yankees sent him back down to Scranton/Wilkes-Barre, so that he could continue to play every game as a third baseman. Following the conclusion of the RailRiders' season, where Andujar had batted .317 with nine home runs and 30 RBIs in 58 games, the Yankees promoted him to the major leagues on September 16.

Andújar began the 2018 season with Scranton/Wilkes-Barre, but was promoted to the major leagues on April 1 after an injury to Billy McKinney. He hit his first major league home run on April 17. On April 23, Andújar hit a solo home run against the Minnesota Twins, marking his 7th consecutive game with an extra base hit. Andújar joined Joe DiMaggio and Mickey Mantle as the only Yankees to ever have 7 consecutive games with an extra base hit under the age of 24. On May 4, Andujar hit his first career walk-off, an RBI single to secure a 7-6 win over the Cleveland Indians. On June 5, he hit his first major league grand slam. On September 29, Andujar hit his 45th double of the season, breaking the Yankees' record for most doubles by a rookie, previously held by Joe DiMaggio. With the Yankees, he batted .297/.328/.527, and saw the lowest percentage of fastballs of all MLB hitters (46.0%). He finished second in the Rookie of the Year Award balloting, behind Shohei Ohtani.

On April 1, 2019, Andújar went on the 10-day injured list due to a right shoulder strain. He was diagnosed with a partial glenoid labrum tear, but chose to rehabilitate the injury rather than undergo surgery. The Yankees activated him on May 4. He batted 3-for-34 before was placed back on the injured list on May 13. On May 15, Andujar was ruled out for the rest of 2019 after revealing that he needed surgery on his right shoulder. He underwent surgery on May 20.

Andújar made his return in spring training in 2020, where he began playing as a left fielder. He began the season batting 1-for-14 (.071) before the Yankees optioned him to their alternate training site.

Andújar was placed on the injured list in early July 2021 with a strained wrist. After suffering a setback in his rehab, Andújar was transferred to the 60-day injured list on August 23.

On March 22, 2022, Andújar signed a $1.3 million contract with the Yankees, avoiding salary arbitration. He began the year with Scranton/Wilkes-Barre, but was later recalled. On June 4, 2022, Andújar was optioned down to Triple-A Scranton and promptly requested to be traded from the Yankees.

On September 8, Andújar hit his first home run in over 14 months, going 2-for-3 with a walk and two RBIs. On September 22, 2022, Andújar was designated for assignment by the Yankees.

Pittsburgh Pirates 
On September 25, 2022, the Pittsburgh Pirates claimed Andújar off waivers. The Pirates signed Andujar to a one year contract worth $1.525 million, avoiding salary arbitration, on November 18. The Pirates designated Andújar for assignment on January 20, 2023, after the signing of Andrew McCutchen was made official.

Personal life
In March 2022, Andújar was robbed at gunpoint at his farm in San Cristóbal, Dominican Republic. Andújar was not shot, but he was beaten. A relative, however, was shot in the finger.

References

External links

1995 births
Living people
Charleston RiverDogs players
Dominican Republic expatriate baseball players in the United States
Gigantes del Cibao players
Gulf Coast Yankees players
Major League Baseball players from the Dominican Republic
Major League Baseball third basemen
New York Yankees players
People from San Cristóbal, Dominican Republic
Pittsburgh Pirates players
Scranton/Wilkes-Barre RailRiders players
Scottsdale Scorpions players
Tampa Yankees players
Toros del Este players
Trenton Thunder players